Sofia Westergren (born 1974) is a Swedish politician. From September 2018 to 2022, she served as Member of the Riksdag representing the constituency of Västra Götaland County West.

References 

Living people
1974 births
Place of birth missing (living people)
21st-century Swedish women politicians
Members of the Riksdag from the Moderate Party
Members of the Riksdag 2018–2022
Women members of the Riksdag